Rajko Rašević ((17 November 1946 – 7 March 2011) was a Yugoslav and Bosnian professional footballer and football manager.

Playing career
Rašević started his playing career in his hometown club Rudar Breza, before eventually reaching the Yugoslav First League where he represented FK Sarajevo and Željezničar. He went on to play abroad in the Swiss Super League

Managerial career
After ending his playing career, Rašević became a football manager, starting out as a coach in the youth team of Bosna Visoko before taking charge of the first team in 1977. He went on to manage Iskra Bugojno, FK Novi Pazar, Süper Lig side Diyarbakır and FK Sarajevo, before retiring from management in 1990 due to bad health.

Death
Rašević died on 7 March 2011 in Visoko, Bosnia and Herzegovina at the age of 64.

References

1946 births
2011 deaths
People from Breza, Bosnia and Herzegovina
Association football defenders
Yugoslav footballers
FK Rudar Kakanj players
NK Bosna Visoko players
NK Maribor players
FK Sarajevo players
FK Željezničar Sarajevo players
SSV Jahn Regensburg players
Neuchâtel Xamax FCS players
Yugoslav First League players
Regionalliga players
Swiss Super League players
Yugoslav expatriate footballers
Expatriate footballers in Germany
Yugoslav expatriate sportspeople in Germany
Expatriate footballers in Switzerland
Yugoslav expatriate sportspeople in Switzerland
Yugoslav football managers
NK Bosna Visoko managers
NK Iskra Bugojno managers
FK Novi Pazar managers
Diyarbakırspor managers
FK Sarajevo managers
Yugoslav First League managers
Süper Lig managers
Yugoslav expatriate football managers
Expatriate football managers in Turkey
Yugoslav expatriate sportspeople in Turkey